is a Japanese footballer currently playing as a midfielder for Nagano Parceiro.

Career statistics

Club
.

Notes

References

1998 births
Living people
Meiji University alumni
Japanese footballers
Japan youth international footballers
Association football midfielders
J3 League players
AC Nagano Parceiro players